Futamura is a Japanese surname. Notable people with the surname include:
, Japanese actor
Fumiko Futamura, Japanese-American mathematician
, Japanese baseball player
, Japanese singer and actor
Yoshihiko Futamura, Japanese computer scientist
Yoshimi Futamura, Japanese-French ceramic artist

Japanese-language surnames